FMSS may refer to:

 Fairfield Methodist School (Secondary), a co-educational Methodist secondary school in Dover, Singapore
 Fletcher's Meadow Secondary School, a high school in Brampton, Ontario, Canada